The National Association of Psychiatric Intensive Care Units and low secure units (NAPICU) is a multi-disciplinary clinician led not-for-profit organisation committed to the development of psychiatric intensive-care units and low secure services in the UK.

It was formed following the 1st National Conference on Psychiatric Intensive Care held in London in 1996 and organised by Dr Dominic Beer, Dr Stephen Pereira and Pharmacist Carol Paton.

The aims of NAPICU are to improve service user experience and outcome, and to promote staff support and development within Psychiatric Intensive Care Units / Low Secure Units by: improving mechanisms for the delivery of psychiatric intensive care and low secure care, auditing effectiveness, promoting research, education and practice development.

The association holds quarterly meetings, academic seminars and an annual national conference.

AIMS-PICU
NAPICU and the Royal College of Psychiatrists have teamed up to develop accreditation for psychiatric intensive care units.  The standards are based on the existing national minimum standards and recently published evidence.  Member units undertake a period of self-assessment and review, followed by peer review.  Once verified units are awarded a certificate of accreditation.

Journal of Psychiatric Intensive Care
Since 2005 the association has published the Journal of Psychiatric Intensive Care.

This peer-reviewed journal is devoted to issues affecting the care and treatment of people with mental disorders who manifest severely disturbed mental or behavioural functioning.  The journal is international and multi-disciplinary in its approach.  It serves the interest of people concerned with these topics in PICUs, Low Secure Units, Challenging Behaviour, Emergency Psychiatry, Intensive Treatments or other parts of the wider mental health system.  The journal seeks to encourage informed debate and exchange of opinion. The content of the journal includes; editorials, original articles, brief reports, reviews, conference reports, news and notices.  Preference is given to original research of scientific quality.

NAPICU executive committee
The NAPICU executive committee is multi-disciplinary and includes clinicians, managers, service user representatives and carers.  The executive meets four times a year to take forward projects, respond to consultation documents and debate wider policy issues.

See also 
 Mental health in the United Kingdom

References

External links
 NAPICU website
 Journal of Psychiatric Intensive Care (up to 2015)]
 Journal of Psychiatric Intensive Care (2016 onwards)

Mental health organisations in the United Kingdom